Campbellfield was a former railway station on the Upfield railway line between Upfield and Gowrie, located in the suburb of Campbellfield, Victoria, just to the north of the level crossing at Camp Road. The station opened in 1889, and closed when passenger service ceased in 1956. The primitive Mallee Shed, which provided the only passenger accommodation, was removed, and no trace of the station remained.

In 2006, it was suggested that that the station might be rebuilt in the not-too-distant future, due to the existence of the Campbellfield Plaza shopping centre nearby, but nothing concrete came of that. However, in April 2017, the Victorian Planning Authority released its draft plan for the area, including the construction of a station at Campbellfield.

Between October and December 2017, the Camp Road level crossing, protected by boom gates, was replaced. The rail line was lowered to pass under the road, and provision was made for both the installation of a second track and the construction of a possible future railway station.

References

Disused railway stations in Melbourne
Railway stations in Australia opened in 1889
Railway stations closed in 1956